Irma Rangel may refer to:

 Irma Rangel (Texas politician) (1931–2003), member of the Texas House of Representatives
 Irma Lerma Rangel Young Women's Leadership School in Dallas, Texas